Olise Cla Meredith III (born June 4, 1983), nicknamed "The Claw," is a former Major League Baseball relief pitcher. He played for the Boston Red Sox, San Diego Padres, and Baltimore Orioles.

Collegiate career
Meredith attended Virginia Commonwealth University and played on their baseball team. Meredith was used almost exclusively as a reliever. He is also VCU's all time ERA leader at 2.52.

Professional career

Boston Red Sox
Meredith was drafted in the 6th round (185th overall) 2004 Major League Baseball draft by the Boston Red Sox after his junior year at VCU.  He started his pro career with their Single-A affiliate the Augusta GreenJackets. In 13 games, he gave up no runs and saved six games, while striking out 18 and walking three.

He was promoted to Sarasota of the Florida State League after his performance in Augusta and put up a 0-2 record with a 2.20 ERA in 16 games with 12 saves, 16 strikeouts and only three walks. In , he pitched 15 innings over 12 games for the Portland Sea Dogs without giving up an earned run, striking out 12 while walking three.

He made his major league debut on May 8,  against Seattle. Meredith walked two batters before allowing a grand slam to Richie Sexson.

San Diego Padres
On May 1, Meredith was traded to the Padres, along with then-Red Sox backup catcher Josh Bard, for catcher Doug Mirabelli. Meredith earned a win in his first appearance for San Diego on May 13, 2006, starting off a record-setting rookie campaign. His 1.07 ERA and .170 batting average against led the National League (minimum 50 innings pitched).

He did not surrender a run in 28 consecutive appearances, a span of 33 innings from July 18 through September 12. That streak set a franchise record, eclipsing Randy Jones' 30-inning scoreless streak. It now stands as the second-longest scoreless stretch by a rookie relief pitcher in the live-ball era.

Baltimore Orioles
In July 2009, Meredith was traded to the Baltimore Orioles for infielder Oscar Salazar.

On December 12, 2009, Meredith avoided arbitration and agreed to a one-year contract with the Baltimore Orioles.

After getting sent down on June 22, 2010, he was designated for assignment to make room for recently acquired Jake Fox.

Washington Nationals
The Washington Nationals signed Meredith to a minor league deal with an invite to spring training on February 2, 2011. On March 27, 2011, the Nationals released him.

Post-baseball

Meredith currently resides in Richmond, Virginia with his wife and 3 children. He is a professional firefighter for Henrico County.

References

External links

1983 births
Living people
Major League Baseball pitchers
Baseball players from Richmond, Virginia
Boston Red Sox players
San Diego Padres players
Baltimore Orioles players
Augusta GreenJackets players
Sarasota Red Sox players
Portland Sea Dogs players
Pawtucket Red Sox players
Portland Beavers players
American people of Welsh descent
VCU Rams baseball players